Mía Monique Espino Meléndez (born 6 September 1994) is an American-raised Guatemalan footballer who plays as a midfielder. She has been a member of the Guatemala women's national team.

References

1994 births
Living people
Women's association football midfielders
Women's association football forwards
Guatemalan women's footballers
Guatemala women's international footballers
American women's soccer players
Soccer players from Chicago
American people of Guatemalan descent
American sportspeople of North American descent
Sportspeople of Guatemalan descent
College women's soccer players in the United States
University of Wisconsin–Parkside alumni
Robert Morris Eagles athletes